The Illinois–Iowa men's basketball rivalry is an intra-Big Ten Conference, college sports rivalry between the Illinois Fighting Illini and Iowa Hawkeyes. The rivalry has been evidenced both on the court and off the court. Among the off the court elements of the rivalry, recruiting of basketball talent has resulted in battles for specific athletes. The most notable battle turned into the Pearl/Thomas Incident which began when both schools sought the services of Deon Thomas and resulted in recruiting restrictions and a one-year post-season ban for Illinois.

History

Illinois and Iowa first met on February 14, 1908 with an Iowa victory, 46–36. The teams would not meet again until 1913 in Urbana, Illinois, however, after 1924 the teams would play every year with the exception of six seasons. Since the two teams are both in the Big Ten Conference, they meet at least once per season. The location of the game alternates between State Farm Center, formerly Assembly Hall, in Champaign, and in Iowa City at Carver-Hawkeye Arena. There have only been a total of five neutral site games in this series.  Illinois leads the series 86-76, a head-to-head record that has become closer after the Hawkeyes ability to win 10 of the last 15 meetings since 2012.

Pearl/Thomas incident 
In 1986 head coach Tom Davis took over an Iowa team from George Raveling that included two key forwards, Ed Horton and Kevin Gamble, each from Lanphier High School in Springfield, Illinois. Utilizing the success of those players, Bruce Pearl, assistant coach and key recruiter for Iowa, was working the state of Illinois to acquire Deon Thomas, a highly talented Chicago Public League player from Simeon High School. Simultaneously, Jimmy Collins, assistant coach to Lou Henson and the Fighting Illini, was also attempting to acquire Thomas.  Pearl brought allegations to the NCAA that Illinois assistant coaches had acted improperly in the recruitment of Thomas, including secretly tape-recorded phone conversations with Thomas that were used in the investigation. While the allegations of improper conduct were unfounded by the NCAA, the investigation did uncover other violations that cost the University of Illinois with restrictions in football and basketball in the manner of limiting scholarships, recruiting and tournament participation.

Coleman/McCaffery Incident
In a game played in Iowa City on February 2, 2020, after an intensely physical game which saw 14 lead-changes and 8 ties, the Hawkeyes would come out on top with a final score of 72–65. During the closing seconds of the game, with Illinois' defense willing to let the final 12 seconds expire, sophomore guard Joe Wieskamp dunked to extend the Iowa lead to 10 points. This appeared to agitate the Illini players and, after a 3-point field goal by Illinois guard Ayo Dosunmu, with four seconds left, the Hawkeyes in-bounded the ball to C. J. Fredrick and it appeared that Illinois was trying to intentionally foul. Fredrick kicked it out to Connor McCaffery, who was hugged by Dosunmu.  Mike Eades, an official for the game, elected not to call the foul as the clock expired. The exchanges between both teams spilled over into the post-game handshake line when Illinois assistant coach Ron Coleman took exception to Joe Wieskamp's dunk with 12 seconds left to give the Hawkeyes a double-digit lead. Coleman shouted profanities in the direction of coach McCaffery, leading the coach to shout back at Coleman and instruct his Hawkeyes to head to the locker room, skipping the handshake line. The Illini staff eventually held their players near the scorer's table to let the Iowa players get to the tunnel to the locker room and off the court.

Ticket scandal
On February 1, 2023, a student spirit group known as "Orange Krush" from the University of Illinois, had 200 tickets to the game taking place on February 4, 2023 at Carver-Hawkeye Arena, rescinded with the $5,400 purchase price returned to the organization. The reason for the denial was due to the leader of the Orange Krush claiming they were being purchased for the Boys and Girls Club of Champaign, a non-profit organization who would get a discounted rate for the 200 tickets. The Iowa Athletic Department deemed this purchase to be under false pretenses, allowing them the right to deny the Orange Krush the opportunity to enter the game and barcodes for the tickets blocked, thus denying them the attempt to make the 20th annual road trip for the group. Because the order was made in September 2022, the Orange Krush had procured donations that could be utilized for charter bus transportation from Champaign to Iowa City. The denial of entry cost the Orange Krush $6,000 that had been paid towards the prearranged transportation. As for the 200 tickets retained by the Iowa Athletic Department, those were donated to the Boys and Girls Club of Cedar Rapids.

Other
Occasional feuds and incidents between the schools' programs have fueled the competition over the years. Iowa has the advantage in the history of the Big Ten tournament. Of the 20+ years the conference tournament has been held, Illinois and Iowa have played a total of 5 times. Iowa holds the record of 3-2 over Illinois. In the 2016 Big Ten tournament the Hawkeyes were the fifth seed and the Illini, who were seeded twelfth, faced each other in the second round with Illinois upsetting Iowa 68–66. Illinois and Iowa squared off in the 2021 Big Ten tournament championship game where Illinois would win their third tournament title.

Accomplishments by the two rivals
The following summarizes the accomplishments of the two programs.

Through March 16, 2023

Game results

Games with both teams ranked
(Rankings are from AP Poll)

Winning team is shown. Ranking of the team at the time of the game by the AP poll is shown under the team name.

Series results
Winning team is shown. Ranking of the team at the time of the game by the AP poll is shown by the team name.

*Denotes game played during the Big Ten tournament

Series statistics 
 Series Record:  Illinois leads 90 to 77
 Current Streak: Iowa, 1 win
 Illinois when ranked: 28-22
 Iowa when ranked: 24-16
 When both teams are ranked: Iowa leads 11-9
 Illinois when unranked: 61-54  
 Iowa when unranked: 52-68
 When both teams are unranked: Illinois leads 50-40
 In overtime games: Illinois leads 6-3
 Neutral site: Iowa leads 3-2
 Longest Illinois W-Streak: 7 (3/1/2008-2/26/2012)
 Longest Iowa W-Streak: 6 (1/4/1975-2/24/1977)
 Longest Illinois Home W-Streak: 17 (2/28/1931-2/14/1953)
 Longest Iowa Home W-Streak: 10 (3/6/1965-2/24/1977)
 Longest Illinois Road W-Streak: 3, twice (last, 3/1/2008-12/29/2010)
 Longest Iowa Road W-Streak: 3 (3/8/1975-1/15/1977)
 Largest Illinois Win Margin: 33 (118-85), 3/4/1990 at ILL
 Largest Illinois Road Win Margin: 23 (74-51), 2/20/1954
 Largest Iowa Win Margin: 25 (95-70), 1/4/1975 at IOWA
 Largest Iowa Road Win Margin: 19 (89-70), 2/21/1955

References

College basketball rivalries in the United States
Big Ten Conference rivalries
Illinois Fighting Illini men's basketball
Iowa Hawkeyes men's basketball